This is a list of career achievements by Wout van Aert, a Belgian professional racing cyclist for UCI WorldTeam . Originally a cyclo-cross competitor as a junior, van Aert has also competed on the road as a professional since 2013.

Career highlights
2016
 Van Aert wins his first UCI Cyclo-cross World Championship title.
 Van Aert wins his first National Cyclo-cross Championship title.
2019
 Van Aert wins his first World Tour stage at the 2019 Critérium du Dauphiné, on the fourth stage. He also won the fifth stage, as well as the points classification.
 Van Aert wins his first National Time Trial Championship title.
 Van Aert wins his first Grand Tour stage in the Tour de France.
2020
 Van Aert wins his first Monument, Milan–San Remo
2021
 Van Aert wins his first National Road Championship title.

Major championships timeline

Cyclo-cross

2011–2012
 2nd  UCI World Junior Championships
 2nd National Junior Championships
 2nd Overall Junior Superprestige
1st Ruddervoorde
2012–2013
 1st Overall Under-23 Superprestige
1st Zonhoven
1st Gavere
1st Gieten
 Under-23 Bpost Bank Trophy
1st Oostmalle
 2nd Overall UCI Under-23 World Cup
 3rd  UCI World Under-23 Championships
 3rd National Under-23 Championships
2013–2014 (1)
 1st  UCI World Under-23 Championships
 1st Overall Under-23 Bpost Bank Trophy
1st Hasselt
1st Essen
1st Loenhout
1st Baal
1st Lille
 1st Otegem
 2nd Overall UCI Under-23 World Cup
1st Namur
1st Nommay
 2nd Overall Under-23 Superprestige
1st Gavere
1st Hoogstraten
1st Middelkerke
2014–2015 (11)
 1st  UEC European Under-23 Championships
 1st Overall Bpost Bank Trophy
1st Koppenberg
1st Hamme
1st Essen
1st Loenhout
1st Baal
2nd Hasselt
2nd Lille
 UCI World Cup
1st Koksijde
2nd Hoogerheide
 1st Bredene
 1st Zonnebeke
 1st Eeklo
 1st Mol
 1st Oostmalle
 2nd  UCI World Championships
 Soudal Classics
2nd Niel
2nd Mechelen
 3rd National Championships
 3rd Overall UCI Under-23 World Cup
1st Namur
2nd Cauberg
2nd Heusden-Zolder
 Superprestige
3rd Hoogstraten
3rd Middelkerke
 Under-23 Superprestige
1st Gieten
1st Zonhoven
1st Gavere
1st Spa-Francorchamps
2015–2016 (18)
 1st  UCI World Championships
 1st  National Championships
 1st  Overall UCI World Cup
1st Las Vegas
2nd Cauberg
2nd Koksijde
2nd Namur
2nd Lignières-en-Berry
2nd Hoogerheide
 1st Overall Superprestige
1st Gieten
1st Zonhoven
1st Gavere
1st Spa-Francorchamps
2nd Ruddervoorde
2nd Hoogstraten
3rd Middelkerke
 1st Overall Bpost Bank Trophy
1st Ronse
1st Koppenberg
1st Hamme
1st Essen
1st Antwerpen
1st Baal
2nd Sint-Niklaas
3rd Loenhout
 Soudal Classics
1st Neerpelt
2nd Mechelen
 1st Eeklo
 1st Erpe-Mere
 1st Kruibeke
 1st Mol
 2nd  UEC European Championships
 2nd Boom
 2nd Oostmalle
2016–2017 (17)
 1st  UCI World Championships
 1st  National Championships
 1st  Overall UCI World Cup
1st Las Vegas
1st Iowa City
1st Heusden-Zolder
1st Rome
2nd Cauberg
2nd Zeven
2nd Namur
 1st Overall DVV Trophy
1st Ronse
1st Koppenberg
1st Essen
1st Loenhout
2nd Hamme
2nd Antwerpen
2nd Baal
2nd Lille
 2nd Overall Superprestige
1st Spa-Francorchamps
2nd Gieten
2nd Zonhoven
2nd Ruddervoorde
2nd Gavere
2nd Diegem
2nd Hoogstraten
2nd Middelkerke
 Brico Cross
1st Geraardsbergen
1st Bredene
2nd Kruibeke
3rd Hulst
 1st Waterloo
 1st Ardooie
 1st Boom
 1st Oostmalle
 2nd Mol
 2nd Overijse
 3rd  UEC European Championships
2017–2018 (9)
 1st  UCI World Championships
 1st  National Championships
 2nd Overall UCI World Cup
1st Zeven
1st Namur
2nd Bogense
2nd Nommay
2nd Hoogerheide
3rd Koksijde
3rd Heusden-Zolder
 2nd Overall Superprestige
1st Boom
1st Gavere
2nd Gieten
2nd Zonhoven
2nd Ruddervoorde
2nd Diegem
 3rd Overall DVV Trophy
2nd Hamme
2nd Antwerpen
2nd Loenhout
2nd Baal
3rd Ronse
 Brico Cross
1st Bredene
2nd Eeklo
2nd Kruibeke
3rd Meulebeke
 Soudal Classics
1st Sint-Niklaas
 1st Ardooie
 2nd Otegem
2018–2019 (4)
 2nd Overall UCI World Cup
1st Pontchâteau
2nd Waterloo
2nd Iowa City
2nd Bern
2nd Koksijde
2nd Namur
2nd Heusden-Zolder
3rd Hoogerheide
 Superprestige
2nd Gieten
2nd Ruddervoorde
2nd Zonhoven
3rd Gavere
 DVV Trophy
2nd Antwerpen
2nd Loenhout
3rd Koppenberg
 Brico Cross
1st Bredene
2nd Geraardsbergen
2nd Meulebeke
2nd Ronse
 1st La Mézière
 1st Ardooie
 2nd  UCI World Championships
 2nd  UEC European Championships
 2nd National Championships
 3rd Wachtebeke
2019–2020 (1)
 DVV Trophy
1st Lille
 2nd Zonnebeke
2020–2021 (5)
 1st  National Championships
 1st  Overall UCI World Cup
1st Dendermonde
1st Overijse
2nd Namur
2nd Hulst
3rd Tábor
 X²O Badkamers Trophy
1st Herentals
2nd Baal
2nd Hamme
3rd Kortrijk
 1st Mol
 Superprestige
2nd Heusden-Zolder
 2nd  UCI World Championships
2021–2022 (9)
 1st  National Championships
 UCI World Cup
1st Val di Sole
1st Dendermonde
 Superprestige
1st Boom
1st Heusden-Zolder
 X²O Badkamers Trophy
1st Loenhout
1st Baal
1st Herentals
 Ethias Cross
1st Essen
2022–2023 (9)
 UCI World Cup
1st Dublin
1st Zonhoven
2nd Antwerpen
2nd Gavere
2nd Benidorm
 Superprestige
1st Heusden-Zolder
1st Diegem
1st Gullegem
 X²O Badkamers Trophy
1st Koksijde
1st Hamme
2nd Herentals
 Exact Cross
1st Mol
1st Loenhout
 2nd  UCI World Championships

UCI World Cup results

Superprestige results

Trofee results

Road

2012
 4th Overall Sint-Martinusprijs Kontich
2014
 8th Overall Ster ZLM Toer
2015
 4th Omloop Het Nieuwsblad U23
 4th Grote Prijs Jef Scherens
2016 (2)
 1st Schaal Sels
 2nd Dwars door het Hageland
 4th Grand Prix Pino Cerami
 8th Overall Tour of Belgium
1st Prologue
2017 (3)
 1st Ronde van Limburg
 1st Bruges Cycling Classic
 1st Grand Prix Pino Cerami
 2nd Schaal Sels
 2nd Rad am Ring
 3rd Dwars door het Hageland
 10th Overall Tour of Belgium
2018 (2)
 1st  Overall Danmark Rundt
1st Stage 2
 3rd  Road race, UEC European Championships
 3rd Strade Bianche
 8th Antwerp Port Epic
 9th Tour of Flanders
 10th Gent–Wevelgem
2019 (4)
 National Championships
1st  Time trial
3rd Road race
 Critérium du Dauphiné
1st  Points classification
1st Stages 4 (ITT) & 5
 Tour de France
1st Stages 2 (TTT) & 10
Held  after Stages 2–5
 2nd E3 Binckbank Classic
 3rd Strade Bianche
 6th Milan–San Remo
2020 (6)
 1st  Time trial, National Championships
 1st Milan–San Remo
 1st Strade Bianche
 Tour de France
1st Stages 5 & 7
 Critérium du Dauphiné
1st  Points classification
1st Stage 1
 UCI World Championships
2nd  Road race
2nd  Time trial
 2nd Tour of Flanders
 3rd Milano–Torino
 8th Gent–Wevelgem
2021 (13)
 1st  Road race, National Championships
 1st  Overall Tour of Britain
1st Stages 1, 4, 6 & 8
 1st Gent–Wevelgem
 1st Amstel Gold Race
 Tour de France
1st Stages 11, 20 (ITT) & 21
 Combativity award Stage 15
 2nd Overall Tirreno–Adriatico
1st  Points classification
1st Stages 1 & 7 (ITT)
 Olympic Games
2nd  Road race
6th Time trial
 2nd  Time trial, UCI World Championships
 2nd Brabantse Pijl
 3rd Milan–San Remo
 4th Strade Bianche
 6th Tour of Flanders
 7th Paris–Roubaix
2022 (9)
 1st Omloop Het Nieuwsblad
 1st E3 Saxo Bank Classic
 1st Bretagne Classic
 Tour de France
1st  Points classification
1st Stages 4, 8 & 20 (ITT)
Held  after Stages 2–5
 Combativity award Stages 6, 18 & Overall
 Critérium du Dauphiné
1st  Points classification
1st Stages 1 & 5
 Paris–Nice
1st  Points classification
1st Stage 4 (ITT)
 2nd Paris–Roubaix
 2nd BEMER Cyclassics
 2nd Grand Prix Cycliste de Montréal
 3rd Liège–Bastogne–Liège
 4th Road race, UCI World Championships
 4th Grand Prix Cycliste de Québec
 8th Milan–San Remo
2023
 3rd Milan–San Remo

General classification results timeline

Classics results timeline

Grand Tour record

Number of wins per year
This table includes number of wins, second-, third-, top 10-place finishes, Points classification wins and race days per year excluding UCI level 2 races.

* Current on 31 January 2023

Awards and honours
 Flandrien Award: 2019, 2020, 2021
Belgian Sportsman of the year: 2020, 2021
 Belgian National Sports Merit Award: 2020
 Vlaamse Reus: 2020
 Kristallen Fiets: 2020. 2021
 Tour de France Combativity award: 2022
 Vélo d'Or: 2nd place: 2022, 3rd place: 2020, 2021

References

External links
 
 
 
 Wout van Aert at Cyclocross24

van Aert